Cape Breton Regional Council is the governing body for the Cape Breton Regional Municipality in the Canadian province of Nova Scotia.

Members
Elected in the 2020 municipal elections

References
"Cecil Clarke wins mayoral bid in Cape Breton". CBC News, October 20, 2012.
"Clarke and new CBRM council sworn in". Cape Breton Post, November 5, 2012.

External links
 Cape Breton Region Council - Councillors

Politics of the Cape Breton Regional Municipality
Municipal councils in Nova Scotia